The 2016–17 Eintracht Braunschweig season is the 123rd season in the club's football history. In 2016–17 the club plays in the 2. Bundesliga, the second tier of German football.

Review and events

The 2016–17 season of Eintracht Braunschweig began on 27 June 2016 with their first training session. For this season, the club wore a special anniversary crest, to commemorate the 50th anniversary of the club's 1966–67 Bundesliga title.

The draw for the first round of the 2016–17 DFB-Pokal happened on 18 June and paired Braunschweig with fellow 2. Bundesliga team Würzburger Kickers.

On 20 July 2016, the team headed for a nine-day-long pre-season training camp in Herxheim bei Landau/Pfalz, Rhineland-Palatinate.

On 15 January 2017, the team headed for a week-long winter training camp in Mijas, Province of Málaga, Spain.

Matches and results

Legend

Friendly matches

2. Bundesliga

League table

Results summary

Results by round

Matches

Promotion play-offs

First leg

Second leg

DFB-Pokal

Squad

Current squad

Transfers

Summer

In:

Out:

Winter

In:

Management and coaching staff 

Since 12 May 2008 Torsten Lieberknecht is the manager of Eintracht Braunschweig.

References

External links 
Eintracht Braunschweig Official Website

Eintracht Braunschweig seasons
Eintracht Braunschweig season 2016-17